Gyroweisia tenuis, the Slender Stubble-moss, is a species of moss belonging to the family Pottiaceae.

It has almost cosmopolitan distribution.

Although worldwide G. tenuis is classified as a species of least concern with a stable population trend, in Iceland, it is found at only one location and has the conservation status of a vulnerable species (VU).

References

Pottiaceae
Taxobox binomials not recognized by IUCN